James Lockyer (1796 – 23 May 1875), sometimes styled as John Lockyer, was an English architect and surveyor, based in London. He worked mostly in the capital but also undertook work in the provinces.

Biography
Lockyer served his pupillage under Robert Abraham before forming his own office. Lockyer worked mostly in London where he designed buildings in Oxford Street and New Bond Street. Perhaps his best known work in the capital was the Royal College of Chemistry in Central London in 1846, long since demolished. His provincial work included the Spa Pump Room, including the nearby Spa Hotel, in Hockley, Essex. Both buildings survive, with the Pump Room being designated as a Grade II listed building.

In 1852 Lockyer re-designed the facade of what is now the Grade I listed White's Club, in Westminster, London. Two years later, he was instructed to carry out the design on Heal's new property in Tottenham Court Road. The following year he rebuilt the facade of 10 Henrietta Street and then, in 1861, the neighbouring property at 9 Henrietta Street, both Grade II listed buildings.

Personal life
Lockyer married Anne Elizabeth  Morant at St George's, Hanover Square, London, on 27 July 1822. Together they had two sons, James (b.1825) and Gilbert (b.1838). James Morant Lockyer was also an architect, designing the Heals building on Tottenham Court Road, before losing his sight.  (James became a successful coachbuilder ref?), whilst Gilbert followed his father into the architectural profession.

Later years and death
Lockyer retired in around 1867 and left his practice to his son, Gilbert. Lockyer was living at 19 Fitzroy Square, Fitzrovia, at the time of his death from paralysis in 1875.

References

1796 births
1875 deaths
19th-century English architects
English ecclesiastical architects
English surveyors
Architects from London